Henry Forbes Low (15 August 1882 – 26 September 1920) was a Scottish professional footballer who made over 200 appearances in the Football League for Sunderland as a left half. He also played in the Scottish League for Aberdeen.

Club career 
A left half, Low began his senior career with newly-formed Northern League club Aberdeen and was a part of their rise from the Northern League to Scottish League Division One during the early years of the 20th century. He made 114 appearances and scored 30 goals during four seasons at Pittodrie and transferred to English First Division club Sunderland for a £400 fee in May 1907. Low played eight seasons for Sunderland, before the suspension of league football in 1915 (following the outbreak of the First World War) ended his competitive career with the club. During his time at Roker Park, Low made 228 appearances, scored 38 goals and was a part of the squad which won the 1912–13 First Division championship and reached the 1913 FA Cup Final.

International career 
Low played in the Home Scots v Anglo-Scots annual international trial matches in 1909 and 1911 and was called up by Scotland for a friendly match versus Ireland in 1913, but he pulled out of the squad in order to play in a 1912–13 FA Cup semi-final. He was not capped at international level.

Personal life 
Low was the elder brother of footballer Wilf Low and the uncle of Willie Low and Norman Low. In February 1917, two-and-a-half years after the outbreak of the First World War, Low enlisted in the Royal Navy as an able seaman. He served on HMS Dido and was honourably discharged after being wounded. Low became the landlord of a pub in Monkwearmouth in 1919 and died of pneumonia in September 1920. He was married with four children.

Honours 
Aberdeen
 Aberdeenshire Cup: 1903–04
 Fleming Charity Cup: 1905–06, 1906–07

Sunderland
 Football League First Division: 1912–13
Newcastle & Sunderland Hospitals Cup: 1912–13, 1914–15

Career statistics

See also
 List of Scottish football families
 List of Sunderland A.F.C. players

References

External links 
 Harry Low at safc.com

1882 births
Scottish footballers
Aberdeen F.C. players
Sunderland A.F.C. players
Footballers from Aberdeen
Association football wing halves
Scottish Football League players
English Football League players
1920 deaths
Association football forwards
Royal Navy personnel of World War I
Scottish landlords
20th-century landowners
Deaths from pneumonia in England
FA Cup Final players
Royal Navy sailors
Orion F.C. players